Jack Newton OAM (30 January 1950 – 14 April 2022) was an Australian professional golfer. He won the Buick-Goodwrench Open on the PGA Tour and won three times on the European Tour, including the British PGA Matchplay Championship in 1974. He won the Australia Open in 1979 and a number of other tournaments in Australia, New Zealand and Africa. Twice, he was a runner-up in major championships, losing the 1975 Open Championship, in a playoff against Tom Watson, and the 1980 Masters Tournament, where he finished four strokes behind the winner, Seve Ballesteros.

In 1983 Newton had a near-fatal accident when he walked into the spinning propeller of an airplane, losing his right arm and eye.

Golf career
Newton was born in Cessnock, New South Wales. He turned professional in 1969. He was one of Australia's most successful golfers in the 1970s and early 1980s. In 1972, he won the Dutch Open and the Benson & Hedges Festival of Golf in successive weeks. In 1974, he won the Benson & Hedges Match Play Championship, beating Cesar Sanudo in the final. Later in 1974, he lost in a playoff for the New Zealand Open. In 1978, Newton won the Buick-Goodwrench Open on the PGA Tour. In Australia, he won the New South Wales Open in 1976 and 1979 and the Australian Open Championship in 1979.

At the 1975 Open Championship at Carnoustie in Scotland, Newton lost in a playoff to Tom Watson. In the third round, Newton set a course record of 65, despite having injured an ankle so severely on the practice tee prior to the start of the championship, that he had it professionally wrapped each day, and was subjected to pain-killing injections. In the final round, Newton was the leader during the back-nine but dropped shots in three of the last four holes. Watson holed a 20-foot putt for a birdie on the 72nd hole to tie Newton. In the 18-hole playoff on the following day, Watson defeated Newton by one stroke (71−72). Newton later said that the turning point in the playoff was when Watson chipped in for an eagle at the 14th hole.

Newton won the PGA Tour of Australia's Order of Merit in 1979. He finished tied for second at the 1980 Masters Tournament, four strokes behind the winner Seve Ballesteros. In May 1983, Newton lost to Terry Gale in a playoff for the Western Australian Open.

Propeller accident
On 24 July 1983, during the height of his professional career, Newton had a near-fatal accident when he walked into the spinning propeller of a Cessna airplane from which he was getting off at Sydney Airport. He lost his right arm and eye, and sustained severe abdominal injuries. A severe rainstorm was in progress at the time, and in addition, safety aspects near the plane were deficient.

Immediately after the accident, doctors gave Newton a 50–50 chance of surviving. He spent several days in a coma and eight weeks in intensive care. After a prolonged rehabilitation from his injuries, Newton returned to public life as a television and radio golf commentator, newspaper reporter, golf course designer, public speaker and chairman of the Jack Newton Junior Golf Foundation. He taught himself to play golf one-handed, swinging the club with his left hand in a right-handed stance. He typically scored in the mid-80s.

In 2003, Newton was diagnosed with meningococcal meningitis, and was rushed to hospital.

Personal life
Newton married his wife Jackie in 1974; they had two children, Kristie and Clint. Clint Newton played rugby league, while Kristie is also a professional golfer.

In 2007, Newton was awarded the Medal of the Order of Australia for services to golf, particularly through a range of executive, youth development and fundraising roles. Newton became a force in the development of junior golfers, for which he was recognised on 13 October 2016 when he was inducted as a general member of the Sport Australia Hall of Fame.

He died on 14 April 2022 at the age of 72 due to health complications, after being diagnosed with Alzheimer's disease in 2020.

Amateur wins
This list may be incomplete
1968 New South Wales Amateur
1969 Lake Macquarie Amateur

Professional wins (13)

PGA Tour wins (1)

PGA Tour playoff record (1–1)

Sources:

European Tour wins (3)

European Tour playoff record (0–1)

Sources:

PGA Tour of Australasia wins (3)

PGA Tour of Australasia playoff record (0–2)

Sources:

Other wins (6)
This list may be incomplete
1972 Amoco Forbes Classic, City of Auckland Classic 
1974 Nigerian Open
1975 Sumrie-Bournemouth Better-Ball (with John O'Leary)
1976 Cock of the North, Mufulira Open

Results in major championships

CUT = missed the half-way cut (3rd round cut in 1973 and 1974 Open Championships)
"T" indicates a tie for a place

Source:

Summary

Team appearances
Amateur
Sloan Morpeth Trophy (representing Australia): 1969 (winners)
Australian Men's Interstate Teams Matches (representing New South Wales): 1968, 1969 (winners)

See also 
 Fall 1976 PGA Tour Qualifying School graduates

References

External links
Jack Newton Junior Golf Foundation

Australian male golfers
PGA Tour of Australasia golfers
PGA Tour golfers
European Tour golfers
Golf writers and broadcasters
Recipients of the Medal of the Order of Australia
Sport Australia Hall of Fame inductees
Australian amputees
Sportsmen from New South Wales
People educated at Epping Boys High School
People from the Hunter Region
1950 births
2022 deaths
Place of death missing